Juno Roxas (born 4 May 1967) is an Australian musician and actor.

Life and career
Roxas was one of the founding members of glam metal band, Roxus (1987–1993). The group released an album in 1991, titled Nightstreet which peaked at number 5 on the ARIA charts.

In 1989, Roxas starred in the Australian AFI award nominated feature film, Mull and recorded versions of "The Wanderer", "Jingle Bell Rock" and "All Right Now" for the film's soundtrack.

Roxas launched his solo career in 1993 on the Melodian label with the single "Almost Summer" and album, Far From Here 1994. Neither impacted on the ARIA chart.

In 1998 Roxas appeared on the Mushroom Records 25th anniversary album, Mushroom 25 Live: The Concert of the Century, and played the accompanying concert performing "Where Are You Now?".

In 2006 Roxas performed with the Pat Cash All Star Band at the Australian Tennis Open.

Discography

Albums
 Far From Here – Melodian (D31196) (1994)

References

External links
 

1967 births
Living people
Australian male film actors
Australian musicians
Australian record producers